Taj Jones (born 26 July 2000) is an Australian cyclist, who currently rides for UCI WorldTeam .

For the 2021 season, Jones joined  for the first part of the season, and on 1 July joined the  team thereafter – signing a contract until the end of the 2023 season.

Major results
2019
 1st Stage 5 Tour of America's Dairyland
2020
 1st Stage 2 Tour de Langkawi
2021
 9th Gran Premio della Liberazione

References

External links

2000 births
Living people
Australian male cyclists
Cyclists from Queensland